Beaverdam Depot is a historic railway depot located at Beaverdam, Hanover County, Virginia.

History
The Richmond, Fredericksburg and Potomac Railroad built a station at Beaverdam on its Louisa line at some time between 1836 and 1840. The railroad's president, Edward Fontaine, lived nearby. The 36 mile Louisa branch connected Louisa with Hanover Junction.  Louisa County farmers could thus ship their produce to the port at Aquia on  the Potomac River as well as to Richmond, Virginia. During the 1840s, the Commonwealth of Virginia helped finance extension of this branch westward over the Blue Ridge Mountains to Covington in Allegheny County. In 1850 the railroad line's name was changed the Virginia Central Railroad.

The station and railroad proved strategic during the American Civil War, both for troop movement and for transport and storage of military supplies. The wood frame depot changed hands and was destroyed at least three times. On July 20, 1862, John Mosby was captured by Union cavalry under Brigadier General Rufus King while waiting for a train. Later versions of the incident disagree as to whether Mosby was trying to convey information to his commander, General Stonewall Jackson in Richmond, or taking brief leave toward his parents' home in Lynchburg, Virginia, but all agree that Mosby was soon released as part of the war's first prisoner exchange, as well as that the Union raiders burnt the depot to destroy supplies, as well as cut the strategic telegraph line.

By the war's end only 5 miles of Virginia Central tracks remained usable.  The Beaverdam station and associated warehouse were among the railroad's first five rebuilt structures; the current station was completed in 1866. The Virginia Central Railroad continued expanding and by the 1880s became part of the Chesapeake and Ohio Railroad system. The segregated waiting room was constructed around 1910, after the U.S. Supreme Court's decision in Chiles v. Chesapeake & Ohio Railway, since Virginia's legislature required segregation of white and "colored" passengers after the Plessy v. Ferguson decision in 1896 allowed "separate but equal" facilities.

Architecture

The single-story, rectangular, gable roofed brick building features decorative brickwork, including corbelling and pilasters.  The front facade includes a small pedimented porch supported by turned wood columns. The interior is divided into two waiting rooms (one for whites and one for blacks), an office, a baggage room and a freight room—all remarkably intact.

It was listed on the National Register of Historic Places in 1988.

References

Former Chesapeake and Ohio Railway stations
Railway stations on the National Register of Historic Places in Virginia
Buildings and structures completed in 1866
Buildings and structures in Hanover County, Virginia
National Register of Historic Places in Hanover County, Virginia
1866 establishments in Virginia